Artur Vitalyevich Fedosseyev (born 29 January 1994 in Semipalatinsk) is a Kazakh former professional cyclist, who most recently rode for UCI Continental team .

In 2014, he was suspended for 2 years after testing positive for Anabolic steroids. This led to the removal of all his results from 2014 including second place in Trofeo Internazionale Bastianelli. After returning from suspension he won his first professional victory in 2019 at the Tour of Fuzhou.

Major results
Sources:
2012
 1st  Road race, National Junior Road Championships
 1st  Cross-country, National Junior Mountain Bike Championships
 2nd Cross-country, Asian Junior Mountain Bike Championships
2013
 8th Overall Tour of Azerbaijan (Iran)
2014
 2nd Trofeo Internazionale Bastianelli
2018
 7th Overall Tour of Cartier
1st  Mountains classification
2019
 1st  Overall Tour of Fuzhou
 1st  Mountains classification

References

External links

1994 births
Living people
Kazakhstani male cyclists
Sportspeople from Semey
20th-century Kazakhstani people
21st-century Kazakhstani people